"Ur Cool" is the debut single by Finnish singer Saara. It was released on 21 April 2015 through Capitol Records, while its lyric video was released on the same day. Upon its release the single reached number-one on the Finnish iTunes top singles list and Spotify Top 50 list.

Composition
"Ur Cool" is a pop song that incorporates elements of bubblegum pop and hip hop and lasts for a total of 2:59. It was written by Joelle Hadjia, Ronald "Jukebox" Jackson, Harmony Smith, and Carmen Reece, and produced by Jackson. The song samples a viral clip from Vine by Elliott Smith.

Background 
After posting the viral video "What Languages Sound Like To Foreigners", Saara attracted a large fanbase, amassing over 300,000 subscribers to her channel. She later posted a video titled "One Girl, 14 Genres" which showcased her musical abilities. This video attracted record labels, with her eventually signing to Capitol Records, the record label which has produced singers such as Katy Perry and Sam Smith. She then began working on her debut album, with "Ur Cool" being its lead single.

Music video
The song's official music video was released in May 2015.

Lyric video
The song's official lyric video was released on 21 April 2015 through Saara's VEVO channel. It was directed by Brainbrow and produced by Targa Sahyoun and Lark Content. It features Saara performing the song with various backgrounds depicting locations such as Egypt, Hollywood, Paris, Mexico and Saara's native country Finland, with subtitles of the language spoken in these places.

Charts

Weekly charts

References

2015 songs
Capitol Records singles
2015 debut singles
Saara (singer) songs
Songs written by Carmen Reece
Songs written by Chuck Harmony
Songs written by Lil' Ronnie